Sega Jagatpur is a village in tehsil Siyana in the Bulandshahr district of Uttar Pradesh, India. The village is situated at the road which connects Lakhaoti to Saidpur, Bulandshahr. The village has a post office, a government middle school, and a primary health centre.

Demographics
According to the census of India 2011, the total number of households are 446 and the total population is 2,675.The Jaats is a big community of this village. The pin code of the village is 203407. The main occupation of villagers is agriculture.Most of the students like defence jobs. The village has a school up to junior level. For further study students have to go nearby towns like Bhawan Bahadur Nagar, Aurangabad and Lakhaoti. There is a post office in the village. Sega Jagatpur is situated near the dis-tributary of the middle Ganga canal. The village is fully electrified under the scheme of Rajeev Gandhi Grameen Vidhutiyakaran Yojna. Every house has electric connection. There is a Panchayat Bhawan in village But it has an illegal tribunal . There is a marriage hall popularly known as Ch. Shyam Singh Mangal Bhawan constructed and managed on charity basis. Most of the young males of the village are in Indian army..There is a hospital in the village with 4 beds facility.

Bahadur Mahespur (2 km), Khad Mohan Nagar (3 km), Madona Jafrabad (3 km), Nirsukha (3 km), Rahimpur Alawa (3 km) are the nearby villages to Sega Jagatpur. Sega Jagatpur is surrounded by Syana Block towards east, Lakhaothi Block towards south, Gulaothi Block towards west , Jahangirabad Block towards South. 

Bulandshahr, Hapur, Sikandrabad, Pilkhuwa are the nearby cities to Sega Jagatpur.

Transport to Sega Jagatpur

From New Delhi

 first reach Bulandshahr—Follow NH 24 and NH 91 to Delhi Rd in Akbapur, follow Delhi Rd to your destination in Moti Bagh, Bulandshahr.
 from Bulandshahr follow UP State highway 65 (it connect Bulandshahr to Garh Mukteshwar), leave the state highway at Lakhaoti, from Lakhaoti follow the road (Lakhaoti to Saidpur), at 6 km from Lakhaoti leave the road at Sega Jagatpur.

From Meerut (two ways)
 reach Bulandshahr from Meerut via Hapur, from Bulandshahr follow UP State highway 65 (it connect Bulandshahr to Garhmukteshwar), leave the state highway at Lakhaoti, from Lakhaoti follow the road (Lakhaoti to Saidpur),at 6 km from Lakhaoti leave the road at Sega Jagatpur.

 reach Garh Mukteshwar from Meerut, from Garhmukteshwar follow UP State highway 65, leave this highway at Lakhaoti, leave the state highway at Lakhaoti, from Lakhaoti follow the road (Lakhaoti to Saidpur), at 6 km from Lakhaoti leave the road at Sega Jagatpur.

Villages in Bulandshahr district

References

NOTABLE PERSONS
Gaurav Dalal Advocate in Supreme Court of India  and Delhi High Court Who appreared and argued in very popular cases like Amrapali Scam etc

Nirdosh Chaudhary, who fought elections of Jila Panchayat and he joined Samajwadi Party but recently he joined Rashtriya Lok Dal and now he is hot contestant of MLA from the seat of Siyana Vidhansabha.
Sumit Chaudhary who is an engineer and serving in good company.
Rajkumar who is Gram Pradhan of Sega Jagatpur.
Aalok Sharma who is running institution of Mobile software in Ghaziabad.